Elbow Lake is a lake in the U.S. state of Washington.

Elbow Lake was so named on account of its bent-shaped outline.

References

Lakes of Thurston County, Washington